Tracked to Earth is a 1922 American silent Western film directed by William Worthington and written by Wallace C. Clifton. The film stars Frank Mayo, Virginia Valli, Harold Goodwin, Duke R. Lee, Buck Connors, and Arthur Millett. The film was released on March 6, 1922, by Universal Film Manufacturing Company.

Cast       
 Frank Mayo as Charles Cranner
 Virginia Valli as Anna Jones
 Harold Goodwin as Dick Jones
 Duke R. Lee as Stub Lou Tate
 Buck Connors as Shorty Fuller
 Arthur Millett as 'Big Bill' Angus
 Lon Poff as Meenie Wade
 Percy Challenger as Zed White

References

External links

 

1922 films
1922 Western (genre) films
Universal Pictures films
Films directed by William Worthington
American black-and-white films
Silent American Western (genre) films
1920s English-language films
1920s American films